The Verizon VIP Tour was an annual concert tour promoted by Live Nation Global Touring and Verizon Wireless. Following in the footsteps of the Verizon Ladies First Tour, the VIP Tour features an emerging female artist as the headliner. The concerts are exclusive to Verizon Wireless customers (although select concerts are open to the public), following an appearance by the headliner at a local Verizon Wireless store. The tour predominantly takes place in the United States. The concert series ran from 2007 to 2009.

Fergie (2007)

The inaugural Verizon VIP Tour was headlined by American singer-songwriter Fergie. The tour supported her debut album, The Dutchess.

Set list 

"Here I Come"
"London Bridge"
"Clumsy"
"Big Girls Don't Cry"
"Don't Lie" / "Hey Mama" / "Shut Up" / "Don't Phunk with My Heart" / "Where Is the Love"
"Pedestal"
"All That I Got (The Make Up Song)"
"My Humps"
"Voodoo Doll"
"Mary Jane Shoes"
"Barracuda"
Encore
"Rehab"
"Glamorous"
"Fergalicious"
"Finally"

Source:

Tour dates

Box office score data

Natasha Bedingfield (2008)

British singer-songwriter Natasha Bedingfield headlined the 2008 Verizon VIP Tour. The tour supported her third studio album, Pocketful of Sunshine.

Opening acts
Kate Voegele (select venues)
The Veronicas (select venues)

Setlist
"Piece of Your Heart"
"Who Knows"
"Pocketful of Sunshine
"These Words"
"Soulmate""
"Pirate Bones"
"Ray of Light
"Love like This"
"Say It Again"
"Freckles" (acoustic version)
"Single" (acoustic version)
"Put Your Arms Around Me"
"Angel"
"Backyard"
"Unwritten"

Tour dates

Box office score data

Bow Wow as Shad Moss (2008)
American rapper Bow Wow was slated to headline a series of concerts in the Fall of 2008. The tour was later canceled without explanation.

Keith Urban (2009)

Australian country singer Keith Urban headlined the concert series in 2009. Unlike previous outings, the tour was very limited, with only six tour dates—as Urban was preparing for his upcoming, "Escape Together World Tour". He serves as the first male performer for the concert series. Urban described the outing as: "Clubs are where it all began. There's just something about the way the band grooves and how the audience gets right up there close and personal, and I love it. So for me there's a nostalgic cool factor in doing this with Verizon."

The tour was also recognized as the No Frills Tour

Setlist
"Days Go By"
"You're My Better Half"1
"Stupid Boy"
"I Told You So"
"'Til Summer Comes Around"
"Kiss a Girl"
"Making Memories of Us"
"Only You Can Love Me This Way"
"Sweet Thing"
"You Look Good in My Shirt"
"Raining on Sunday"
"You'll Think of Me"1
"Who Wouldn't Wanna Be Me"
"Somebody Like You"

Encore
"Tonight I Wanna Cry"1
"Better Life"1

1Performed at select dates
Source:

Additional notes
"Once in a Lifetime" was included at the performances at the House of Blues in Dallas, Texas and the Theatre of the Living Arts in Philadelphia, Pennsylvania.
"You'll Think of Me" was not included at the performances at the Theatre of the Living Arts in Philadelphia, Pennsylvania. 
"You're My Better Half" was not included in the performance at the House of Blues in Los Angeles, California. At the same performance, "I Told You So" was not performed as well. 
"Where the Blacktop Ends" was performed at the House of Blues in Los Angeles, California; the Webster Hall in New York City and the Theatre for the Living Arts in Philadelphia, Pennsylvania
"Who Wouldn't Wanna Be Me" was not included at the performance at the Webster Hall in New York City. 
"Better Life" was not performed at Joe's Bar on Weed St. in Chicago, Illinois. 
"Tonight I Wanna Cry" was not included at the performance at the Webster Hall in New York City.

Tour dates

References

External links
Verizon VIP Tour Official Website
Fergie's Official Website
Natasha Bedingfield's Official Website
Keith Urban's Official Website

2007 concert tours
2008 concert tours
2009 concert tours
Natasha Bedingfield
Verizon Communications